Quench polish quench (QPQ) is a specialized type of nitrocarburizing case hardening that increases corrosion resistance. It is sometimes known by the brand name of Tufftride, Tenifer or Melonite. Three steps are involved: nitrocarburize ("quench"), polish, and post-oxidize ("quench").

This process is often used when two or more of the following properties are required in a workpiece:
 wear resistance
 corrosion resistance
 lubricity
 fatigue strength

Common applications of the process are for piston rods of shock absorbers, cylinders and rods for hydraulic systems, pumps, axles, spindles, firearm slides and barrels and valves.

Process
The process starts with a standard salt bath nitrocarburizing cycle, which produces a layer of ε iron nitride.
Next, the workpiece is mechanically polished; typical polishing processes include vibratory finishing, lapping, and centerless grinding. Finally, the workpiece is re-immersed into the salt quench bath for 20 to 30 minutes, rinsed, and oil dipped. This last step optimizes the corrosion resistance by creating a layer of iron oxide about 3 to 4 micrometers thick. It also gives the workpiece a black finish.

Corrosion resistance

Field immersion

The chart on the right shows a comparison of corrosion resistance against other surface treatments, based on field immersion tests. Test conditions for the immersion test are full immersion in 3% sodium chloride plus 3 g /L of hydrogen peroxide for 24 hours.

Salt spray test
The chart on the right shows a comparison of the corrosion resistance of surface treated steel automotive steering columns based on the ASTM B117 salt spray test.

References

External links

Metal heat treatments
Corrosion prevention